The Hissing of Summer Lawns is the seventh studio album by Joni Mitchell. It was released in November 1975 on Asylum Records. The album continues the jazz-influenced sound of Mitchell's previous album Court and Spark while featuring more unconventional and experimental material than its predecessor. Additionally, the album saw Mitchell experiment with sampling and synthesizers such as the Moog and ARP. Contributors to the album include jazz-rock groups the L.A. Express and the Jazz Crusaders alongside backing appearances by James Taylor, David Crosby, and Graham Nash.

Lyrically, many songs on the album focus on narratives revolving around womens' experiences such as standing up to patriarchal norms ("Don't Interrupt the Sorrow") or frustrations with suburban life (the title track, "Harry's House"). As with many of Mitchell's albums, she created the cover art herself, in this case a painting depicting a group of men carrying a large snake superimposed over the Beverly Hills suburbs; Mitchell's own house can be seen shaded in light blue.

While it did not spawn a major hit single like its predecessor, The Hissing of Summer Lawns was commercially successful, reaching number 4 in the US and becoming her final top 10 album to date. "In France They Kiss on Main Street" was released as the only single and peaked at number 66 on the Billboard Hot 100, her final song to make the chart for the next four years.

The Hissing of Summer Lawns initially received criticism, with reviewers finding the jazz stylings of the music to be a  disservice to Mitchell's lyrics and comparing it negatively to Court and Spark. However, the album has seen a retrospective appraisal and has gone on to become one of her most acclaimed works. The album appeared at number 258 in Rolling Stones 2020 edition of its list of the 500 greatest albums of all time, and at number 217 in the third edition of Colin Larkin's All Time Top 1000 Albums in 2000.

Background
The slick jazz-pop sound Mitchell developed on Court and Spark (1974) would be pushed into more adventurous territory on The Hissing of Summer Lawns. On "The Jungle Line", Mitchell is credited with the first commercially released song to included a sampling, featuring a looped recording of percussion by the African group the Drummers of Burundi. This interest in world music presaged the work of Peter Gabriel and Paul Simon in subsequent years. Other tracks reflect a fusion of jazz and "shimmering avant pop." The album also uses an ARP synthesizer.

Songs

The first track, "In France They Kiss on Main Street", is a jazz-rock song about coming of age in a small town in the 1950s rock & roll era. (The song was released as the single from the album and reached number 66 on the Billboard charts.) "The Jungle Line" uses a field recording from Africa of the Drummers of Burundi (called 'warrior drums' in the credits), onto which are dubbed guitar, Moog synthesizer and the vocal line. The lyrics pay homage to the works of the French Post-Impressionist painter Henri Rousseau. Mitchell blends details of his works with imagery of modern city life, the music industry and the underground drug culture.

"Edith and the Kingpin" marks a return to jazz in a story of a gangster's new moll arriving in his home town. "Don't Interrupt the Sorrow" is an acoustic guitar-based song with stream-of-consciousness lyrics, focused on women standing up to male dominance and proclaiming their own existence as individuals. "Shades of Scarlett Conquering" is an orchestral-based piece about a modern southern belle basing her life and self-image on the stereotypes of the Scarlett O'Hara character from Gone with the Wind.

The second side begins with the title track, "The Hissing of Summer Lawns", which is about a woman who chooses to stay in a marriage where she is treated as part of her husband's portfolio. "The Boho Dance" comments on people who feel that artists betray their artistic integrity for commercial success, with an ironic glance at those who said this of Mitchell herself and parallels Tom Wolfe's The Painted Word. "Harry's House / Centerpiece" concerns failing marriage as example of the loneliness of modern life and frames the jazz standard "Centerpiece" by Harry "Sweets" Edison and Jon Hendricks. "Sweet Bird" is a sparser acoustic track that is a slight return to Mitchell's so-called 'confessional' singer-songwriter style and addresses the loss of beauty power with ageing. Its lyrics indicate that it may also be a reference to Tennessee Williams's Sweet Bird of Youth. The final track is "Shadows and Light", consisting of many overdubs of her voice and an ARP String Machine (credited as an ARP-Farfisa on the album sleeve).

The African theme of "The Jungle Line" also features on the album sleeve, with an image of dark-skinned people carrying a large snake (both were embossed on the original vinyl album cover). Both men and snake are superimposed on the Beverly Hills suburbs, with Mitchell's own house marked in blue (green for the UK issue) on the back cover.

Reception

The album initially received harsh criticism. In Rolling Stone, Stephen Holden wrote that the album's lyrics were impressive but the music was a failure. "If The Hissing of Summer Lawns offers substantial literature, it is set to insubstantial music... Four members of Tom Scott's L.A. Express are featured on Hissing, but their uninspired jazz-rock style completely opposes Mitchell's romantic style... The Hissing of Summer Lawns is ultimately a great collection of pop poems with a distracting soundtrack. Read it first. Then play it." Critic Robert Christgau called the musical accompaniment "the most ambitious of her career," but criticized Mitchell's choice of session musicians and opined that "only on a couple of cuts — 'The Jungle Line' and 'Don't Interrupt the Sorrow' — do these skillful sound effects strengthen the lyrics. The result is that Mitchell's words must stand pretty much on their own."

The record's reputation has grown in stature over the years. Music writer Howard Sounes has called The Hissing of Summer Lawns Mitchell's masterpiece, "an LP to stand alongside Blood on the Tracks". Prince, a lifelong fan of Mitchell, praised it in interviews; he reportedly called it "the last album I loved all the way through." Critic Jessica Hopper of Pitchfork noted that the album was originally felt as a betrayal by some listeners, but stated that while "it doesn't have the rhapsodic rep as Blue, it's unquestionably one of Mitchell's finest albums, and it is certainly her most timeless."

Accolades
In 1977, at the 19th Grammy Awards, Mitchell was nominated for the Grammy Award for Best Female Pop Vocal Performance for the album.

It was voted number 217 in the third edition of Colin Larkin's All Time Top 1000 Albums (2000). The album was included in Robert Dimery's 1001 Albums You Must Hear Before You Die. in 2020, Rolling Stone ranked the album at number 258 in the 2020 edition of its 500 greatest albums of all time.

Track listing

Personnel
Track numbering refers to CD and digital releases of the album.
Joni Mitchell – vocals, acoustic guitar (tracks 1–4, 9), Moog (2), piano (5, 9), keyboards (7), ARP and Farfisa (10)
Victor Feldman – electric piano (1, 5), congas (4), vibes (5), keyboards and percussion (6)
Joe Sample – electric piano (3), keyboards (8)
Larry Carlton – electric guitar (3–5, 9)
Robben Ford – electric guitar (1), Dobro (4), guitar (8)
Jeff Baxter – electric guitar (1)
James Taylor – background vocals (1), guitar (6)
David Crosby and Graham Nash – background vocals (1)
Max Bennett – bass (1, 5–8)
Wilton Felder – bass (3, 4)
John Guerin – drums (except 2), Moog and arrangement (6)
The Warrior Drums of Burundi (2)
Chuck Findley – horn (3), trumpet (6, 8), flugelhorn (7)
Bud Shank – saxophone and flute (3, 6), bass flute (7)
Dale Oehler – string arrangement (5)Technical'
Joni Mitchell – producer, cover design, illustration
Henry Lewy – engineer, mix with Mitchell
Ellis Sorkin – assistant engineer
Bernie Grundman – mastering
Joe Gastwirt – re-mastered at Ocean View Digital Mastering in W. Los Angeles for 1997 HDCD release 
Norman Seeff – photography

Charts

References

1975 albums
Joni Mitchell albums
Asylum Records albums
Albums recorded at A&M Studios
Avant-pop albums
Albums produced by Joni Mitchell
Albums with cover art by Joni Mitchell
Art rock albums by Canadian artists